The beginning of human personhood is the moment when a human is first recognized as a person. There are differences of opinion as to the precise time when human personhood begins and the nature of that status. The issue arises in a number of fields including science, religion, philosophy, and law, and is most acute in debates relating to abortion, stem cell research, reproductive rights, and fetal rights.

Traditionally, the concept of personhood has entailed the concept of soul, a metaphysical concept referring to a non-corporeal or extra-corporeal dimension of human being. In modernity, the concepts of subjectivity and intersubjectivity, personhood, mind, and self have come to encompass a number of aspects of human being previously considered to be characteristics of the soul. With regard to the beginning of human personhood, one historical question has been when the soul enters the body. In modern terms, the question could be put instead at what point the developing individual develops personhood or selfhood.

Related issues attached to the question of the beginning of human personhood include both the legal status, bodily integrity, and subjectivity of mothers, as well as the philosophical concept of "natality", i.e. "the distinctively human capacity to initiate a new beginning", which a new human life embodies.

Biological markers

Fertilization 
Fertilization is the fusing of the gametes, that is a sperm cell and an ovum (egg cell), to form a zygote. At this point, the zygote is genetically distinct from either of its parents.

Fertilization was not understood in ancient times. Hippocrates believed that the embryo was the product of male semen and a female factor. But Aristotle held that only male semen gave rise to an embryo, while the female only provided a place for the embryo to develop, (a concept he acquired from the preformationist Pythagoras). In 1651 William Harvey refuted Aristotle's idea that menstrual blood could be involved in the formation of a fetus, asserting that eggs from the female were somehow caused to become a fetus as a result of sexual intercourse. Sperm cells were discovered in 1677 by Antonie van Leeuwenhoek, who believed that Aristotle had been proven correct. Some observers believed they could see an entirely pre-formed little human body in the head of a sperm. The human ova was first observed in 1827 by Karl Ernst von Baer. Only in 1876 did Oscar Hertwig prove that fertilization is due to fusion of an egg and sperm cell.

Fertilization is a process lasting around 24 hours, after which more than a third of zygotes are lost in the first few days. Many fail to implant into the uterine wall, sloughing off with the endometrial lining during menstruation. Of those which implant, around 50% are miscarried, usually without the woman knowing anything has happened. A zygote that is not lost will sometimes split into two zygotes. Separately, two individually fertilized zygotes will sometimes fuse into one zygote.

A single-cell embryonic human zygote can be described as a "whole living human being" in contrast to sperm or egg cells, which are also human life but are only parts of other human beings and are not genetically unique. Even then, the twinning process occurring after fertilization "weakens the possibility of seeing individuality as something irreversibly resolved" after fertilization.

Some members of the medical community accept fertilization as the point at which life begins.  Dr. Bradley M. Patten from the University of Michigan wrote in Human Embryology that the union of the sperm and the ovum "initiates the life of a new individual" beginning "a new individual life history."  In the standard college text book Psychology and Life, Dr. Floyd L. Ruch wrote "At the time of conception, two living germ cells—the sperm from the father and the egg, or ovum, from the mother—unite to produce a new individual."  Dr. Herbert Ratner wrote that "It is now of unquestionable certainty that a human being comes into existence precisely at the moment when the sperm combines with the egg."  This certain knowledge, Ratner says, comes from the study of genetics.  At fertilization, all of the genetic characteristics, such as the color of the eyes, "are laid down determinatively."  James C. G. Conniff noted the prevalence of the above views in a study published by The New York Times Magazine in which he wrote, "At that moment conception takes place and, scientists generally agree, a new life begins—silent, secret, unknown."

The view that life begins at fertilization reached acceptance from mainstream sources at one point.  In 1967, New York City school officials launched a large sex education program.  The fifth grade textbook stated "Human life begins when the sperm cells of the father and the egg cells of the mother unite.  This union is referred to as fertilization.  For fertilization to take place and a baby to begin growing, the sperm cell must come in direct contact with the egg cell."  Similarly, a textbook used in Evanston, Illinois stated: "Life begins when a sperm cell and an ovum (egg cell) unite."

Implantation 
In his book Aborting America, Bernard Nathanson argued that implantation should be considered the point at which life begins.
Biochemically, this is when alpha [the unborn human] announces its presence as part of the human community by means of its hormonal messages, which we now have the technology to receive.  We also know biochemically that it is an independent organism distinct from the mother.

In their book, When Does Human Life Begin?, John L. Merritt, MD and his son J. Lawrence Meritt II, MD, present the idea that if "the breath of life" (Genesis 2:7) is oxygen, then a blastocyst starts taking in the breath of life from the mother's blood at the moment it successfully implants in her womb, which usually happens nine days after fertilization. Contrariwise, Rabbi Goldie Milgram writes that Jewish tradition interprets the same biblical phrase "breath of life" as the Earth's atmosphere, such that life starts when the baby's head emerges from the mother's body, and the baby takes its first breath of air.

Segmentation 
Non-conjoined monozygotic twins form up to day 14 of embryonic development, but when twinning occurs after 14 days, the twins will likely be conjoined. Some argue that an early embryo cannot be a person because "If every person is an individual, one cannot be divided from oneself."

However, Fr. Norman Ford stated that "the evidence would seem to indicate not that there is no individual at conception, but that there is at least one and possibly more."  He went on to support the idea that, similar to processes found in other species, one twin could be the parent of the other asexually. Theodore Hall agreed with the plausibility of this explanation saying, "We wonder if the biological process in twinning isn't simply another example of how nature reproduces from other individuals without destroying that person's or persons' individuality."

Brain function (brain birth)

In the years since the designation of brain death as a new criterion for death, attention has been directed towards the central role of the nervous system in a number of areas of ethical decision-making. The notion that there exists a neurological end-point to human life has led to efforts at defining a corresponding neurological starting-point. This latter quest has led to the concept of brain birth (or brain life), signifying the converse of brain death. The quest for a neurological marker of the beginning of human personhood owes its impetus to the perceived symmetry between processes at the beginning and end of life, thus if brain function is a criterion used to determine the medical death of a person, it should also be the criterion for its beginning.

Just as there are two types of brain death - whole brain death (which refers to the irreversible cessation of function of both the brain stem and higher parts of the brain) and higher brain death (destruction of the cerebral hemispheres alone, with possible retention of brain stem function), there are two types of brain birth (based on their reversal) - brain stem birth at the first appearance of brain waves in lower brain (brain stem) at 6–8 weeks of gestation, and higher brain birth, at the first appearance of brain waves in higher brain (cerebral cortex) at 22–24 weeks of gestation.

Fetal viability 
"Until the fetus is viable, any rights granted to it may come at the expense of the pregnant woman, simply because the fetus cannot survive except within the woman's body. Upon viability, the pregnancy can be terminated, as by a c-section or induced labor, with the fetus surviving to become a newborn infant. Several groups believe that abortion before viability is acceptable, but is unacceptable after" is the perspective of Planned Parenthood, a major abortion provider. In some countries, early abortions are legal in all circumstances, but late-term abortions are limited to circumstances where there is a clear medical need. While there is no sharp limit of development, gestational age, or weight at which a human fetus automatically becomes viable, a 2013 study found that "While only a small proportion of births occur before 24 completed weeks of gestation (about 1 per 1000), survival is rare and most of them are either fetal deaths or live births followed by a neonatal death."

Birth
Others believe that as long as the fetus is still inside the body of the woman (whether it is viable or not), it does not have any rights of its own. In Jewish law, life begins at first breath.

Other markers
There are also other ideas of when personhood is achieved:
 at ensoulment, or quickening
 at "formation" – an early concept of bodily development (see Preformationism).
 at the emergence of consciousness
 at the emergence of rationality (see Kant)

Human personhood may also be seen as a work-in-progress, with the beginning being a continuum rather than a strict point in time.

Individuation
Philosophers such as Aquinas use the concept of individuation. In regard to the abortion debate, they argue that abortion is not permissible from the point at which individual human identity is realised. Anthony Kenny argues that this can be derived from everyday beliefs and language and one can legitimately say "if my mother had an abortion six months into her pregnancy, she would have killed me" then one can reasonably infer that at six months the "me" in question would have been an existing person with a valid claim to life. Since division of the zygote into twins through the process of monozygotic twinning can occur until the fourteenth day of pregnancy, Kenny argues that individual identity is obtained at this point and thus abortion is not permissible after two weeks.

Quickening 
Quickening is the moment that the pregnant woman starts to feel the fetus' movement in the uterus. The word quick originally meant alive, and quicken means to grant life. Historically some early abortion laws were based around this standard.

Although not commonly in use today, the quickening standard for personhood was historically used in England, as well as other places that based their legal systems off of the English legal system, like the U.S. states of Connecticut and New York.

Adulthood 
Historically, children weren't always seen as people. Infanticide in many historical cultures was commonly practised. Even as recently as the mid 19th century, the law in the US was ambiguous as to whether children under 18 were persons.

Philosophical and religious perspectives

Answers to the question of when human life begins and when personhood begins have varied among social contexts, and have changed with shifts in ethical and religious beliefs, sometimes as a result of advances in scientific knowledge; in general they have developed in parallel with attitudes to abortion and to the use of infanticide as a means of reproductive control.

Since the zygote is genetically identical to the embryo, the fully formed fetus, and the baby, questioning the beginning of personhood could lead to an instance of the Sorites paradox, also known as the paradox of the heap.

Neil Postman has written that in pre-modern societies, the lives of children were not regarded as unique or valuable in the same way they are in modern societies, in part as a result of high infant mortality. However, when childhood began to develop its own distinctive features (including graded schools to teach reading, children's stories, games, etc.) this view changed. According to Postman, "the custom of celebrating a child's birthday did not exist in America throughout most of the eighteenth century, and, in fact, the precise marking of a child's age in any way is a relatively recent cultural habit, no more than two hundred years old."

Ancient writers held diverse views on the subject of the beginning of personhood, understood as the soul's entry or development in the human body. In Panpsychism in the West, David Skrbina noted the various kinds of soul envisioned by the early Greeks.

Generally, the question of the ensoulment of the fetus revolved around the question of when the rational soul entered the body, whether it was an integral part of the bodily form and substance, or whether it was pre-existent and subject to reincarnation or pre-existence. 

Aristotle developed a theory of progressive ensoulment. In On the Generation of Animals, he declared that the soul develops first a vegetative soul, then animal, and finally human, adding that abortions were permissible early in pregnancy, before certain biological processes began. He believed that the female substance was passive, the male active, and that it required time for the male substance to "animate" the whole.

Hippocrates and the Pythagoreans stated that fertilization marked the beginning of a human life, and that the human soul was created at the time of fertilization.  

According to Hinduism Today, Vedic literature states that the soul enters the body at conception.

Concepts of pre-existence are found in various forms in Platonism, Judaism, and Islam. 
 
The Jewish Talmud holds that all life is precious but that a fetus is not a person, in the sense of termination of pregnancy being considered murder. If a woman's life is endangered by a pregnancy, an abortion is permitted.  However, if the "greater part" of the fetus has emerged from the womb, then its life may not be taken even to save the woman's, "because you cannot choose between one human life and another".

Some medieval Christian theologians held that ensoulment occurs when an infant takes its first breath of air.  They cite, among other passages, Genesis 2:7, which reads: "And the Lord God formed man of the dust of the ground, and breathed into his nostrils the breath of life; and man became a living soul."

The Early Church held various views on the subject, primarily either the ensoulment at conception or delayed hominization. Tertullian held a view, traducianism, which was later condemned as heresy. This view held that the soul was derived from the parents and generated in parallel with the generation of the physical body. This viewpoint was deemed unsatisfactory by St. Augustine, as it did not account for original sin. Basing himself on the Septuagint version of Exodus 21:22, he affirmed the Aristotelian view of delayed hominization. 

St. Thomas Aquinas and St. Augustine of Hippo held the view that fetuses were "animated" (using Aristotle's term for ensoulment) near the 40th day after conception. However, both held that abortion was always gravely wrong, because it involves the medical termination of a human PID (person-in-development).

In general, the soul was viewed as some kind of animating principle; and the human variety was referred to as the "rational soul".

Some, but not all, followers of Jainism have promoted the idea that sperm cells contain life or jivas and thus harming them goes against the principle of non-violence (ahimsa). Celibacy or abstinence from sex (bramacharya) can be practiced as a way to avoid releasing sperm, but is unrelated to the broader practice of celibacy in Jainism.

Catholic philosopher Peter Kreeft goes so far as to say "This is widely accepted still today and has been verified by the scientific community".

That a human individual's existence begins at fertilization is the accepted position of the Roman Catholic Church, whose Pontifical Academy for Life declared: "The moment that marks the beginning of the existence of a new 'human being' is constituted by the penetration of sperm into the oocyte. Fertilization promotes a series of linked events and transforms the egg cell into a 'zygote'." The Congregation for the Doctrine of the Faith also has stated and reaffirmed: "From the time that the ovum is fertilized, a new life is begun which is neither that of the father nor of the mother; it is rather the life of a new human being with his own growth." Eastern Orthodox churches and most of the more conservative Protestant denominations also teach this view of life.

Ethical perspectives
The distinction in ethical value between existing persons and potential future persons has been questioned. Subsequently, it has been argued that contraception and even the decision not to procreate at all could be regarded as immoral on a similar basis as abortion. Subsequently, any marker of the beginning of human personhood doesn't necessarily mark where it is ethically right or wrong to assist or intervene. In a consequentialistic point of view, an assisting or intervening action may be regarded as basically equivalent whether it is performed before, during or after the creation of a human being, because the end result would basically be the same, that is, the existence or non-existence of that human being. In a view holding value in bringing potential persons into existence, it has been argued to be justified to perform abortion of an unintended pregnancy in favor for conceiving a new child later in better conditions.

Personhood in law

Ecclesiastical courts

Following the decline of the Western Roman Empire and the adoption of Christianity as the Roman state religion, ecclesiastical courts held wide jurisdiction throughout Europe. According to Donald DeMarco, PhD, the Church treated the killing of an unformed or "unanimated" fetus as a matter of "anticipated homicide", with a corresponding lesser penance required. In the Catechism of the Catholic Church, the following statement regarding the beginning of human life and personhood is provided: "Human life must be respected and protected absolutely from the moment of conception. From the first moment of his existence, a human being must be recognized as having the rights of a person - among which is the inviolable right of every innocent being to life."

Common law

Although abortion in the United Kingdom was traditionally dealt with in the ecclesiastical courts, English common law addressed the issue from 1115 on, beginning with first mention in Leges Henrici Primi. In this treatise, abortion, even of a "formed" fetus, was a "quasi-homicide", carrying a penalty of 10 years' penance. This was a much lesser penalty than would accrue to full homicide. With the exception of Bracton, later writers insisted that killing a fetus was "great misprision, and no murder", as formulated by Sir Edward Coke in his Institutes of the Lawes of England. Coke noted that the murder victim must have been "a reasonable creature in rerum natura", in accordance with the standards of murder in English law. This formulation was repeated by Sir William Blackstone in England and in Bouvier's Law Dictionary in the United States.

The reasonableness of the creature is of some considerable weight in the legal conception of personhood. Children are not considered full persons under the law until they reach the age of majority.

Nonetheless, children have been treated as persons with respect to bodily offences, beginning with Offences against the Person Act 1828, although this protection did not prevent children from being sold by their parents, as in the Eliza Armstrong case, long after the slave trade had been abolished in England.

In addition, "a child en ventre sa mere" (in utero) was regarded by common law as "in being," or "as born" when ensuring that wills and trusts do not run afoul of the rule against perpetuities; nine (or sometimes ten) months of gestation were allotted for this purpose.

Legal perspectives

Ireland

The 1983 Eighth Amendment granted the full right to life, and personhood, to any "unborn". As such, abortion was banned in nearly all cases, except to save the life of the mother. This was repealed on 25 May 2018 by a 66% voting margin, with abortion becoming legal on 1 January 2019.

United States
In its 1885 decision McArthur v. Scott, the US Supreme Court affirmed the common law principle that a child in its mother's womb can be regarded as "in being" for the purpose of resolving a dispute about wills and trusts.

In 1973, Harry Blackmun wrote the court opinion for Roe v. Wade, saying "We need not resolve the difficult question of when life begins. When those trained in the respective disciplines of medicine, philosophy, and theology are unable to arrive at any consensus, the judiciary, at this point in the development of man's knowledge, is not in a position to speculate."

In 2002, the Born-Alive Infants Protection Act was enacted, which ensures that the legal concepts of person, baby, infant, and child include those which have been born alive in the course of a miscarriage or abortion, regardless of development, gestational age, or whether the placenta and umbilical cord are still attached.  This law makes no comment on personhood in utero but ensures that no person after birth is characterized as not a person.

In 2003, the Partial-Birth Abortion Ban Act was enacted, which prohibits an abortion if "either the entire baby's head is outside the body of the mother, or any part of the baby's trunk past the navel is outside the body of the mother."
 	
In 2004, President George W. Bush signed the Unborn Victims of Violence Act into law. The law effectively extends personhood status to a "child in utero at any stage of development, who is carried in the womb" if they are targeted, injured or killed during the commission of any of over 60 listed violent crimes. The law also prohibits the prosecutions of "any person for conduct relating" to a legally consented to abortion.

Today, 38 U.S. States legally recognize a human fetus or "unborn child" as a crime victim, at least for the purpose of homicide or feticide laws. According to progressive media watchdog Media Matters for America, "Further, a prenatal personhood measure might subject a woman who suffers a pregnancy-related complication or a miscarriage to criminal investigations and possibly jail time for homicide, manslaughter or reckless endangerment. And because so many laws use the terms "persons" or "people," a prenatal personhood measure could affect large numbers of a state's laws, changing the application of thousands of laws and resulting in unforeseeable, unintended, and absurd consequences."

In the United States, the 1992 United States Supreme Court case of Planned Parenthood v. Casey held that a law cannot place legal restrictions imposing an undue burden for "the purpose or effect of placing a substantial obstacle in the path of a woman seeking an abortion of a nonviable fetus." This standard was also upheld in the Supreme Court case of Whole Woman's Health v. Hellerstedt (2016) in which several Texas restrictions were struck down, but was overturned in 2022 by Dobbs v. Jackson Women's Health Organization holding that there was no constitutional right to an abortion.

See also 
 Beginning of pregnancy controversy
 Human life (disambiguation)
 Philosophical aspects of the abortion debate

References 

Abortion
Medical ethics
Personhood